Tochiisami Yoshiharu (born 2 October 1947 as Tetsuo Abe) is a former sumo wrestler from Inakadate, Aomori, Japan. He made his professional debut in March 1963, and reached the top division in July 1969. His highest rank was maegashira 7. He retired in November 1979 and became an elder in the Japan Sumo Association under the name Iwatomo. He reached the mandatory retirement age of 65 in October 2012. The Iwatomo name is now owned by former maegashira Kimurayama, also of the Kasugano stable.

Career record

See also
Glossary of sumo terms
List of past sumo wrestlers
List of sumo tournament second division champions

References

1947 births
Living people
Japanese sumo wrestlers
Sumo people from Aomori Prefecture